Kihesa is an administrative ward in the Iringa Urban district of the Iringa Region of Tanzania. In 2016 the Tanzania National Bureau of Statistics report there were 19,040 people in the ward, from 18,196 in 2012.

Neighborhoods 
The ward has 15 neighborhoods.

 Dodoma Road A
 Dodoma Road B
 Dodoma Road F
 Ilembula
 Kilimani
 Mafifi
 Mbuma
 Mfaranyaki
 Msikitini
 Mwenge
 Ngome
 Ramadhani Waziri
 Semtema A
 Semtema B
 Sokoni

References 

Wards of Iringa Region